Nes is a former municipality in the old Hedmark county, Norway. The  municipality existed from 1838 until its dissolution in 1964 when it became part of Ringsaker Municipality. The administrative centre was the village of Tingnes where Nes Church is located. The largest village in Nes was Stavsjø where the Stavsjø Church is located. The municipality included the Nes peninsula and the island of Helgøya which both are surrounded by the large lake Mjøsa, Norway's largest lake.

History
The parish of Næs was established as a municipality on 1 January 1838 (see formannskapsdistrikt law). During the 1960s, there were many municipal mergers across Norway due to the work of the Schei Committee. On 1 January 1964, the municipality of Nes (population: 4,184) was merged with the municipality of Furnes (population: 7,288), the municipality of Ringsaker (population: 16,490), and the Hamarsberget and Vikersødegården areas of the municipality of Vang (population: 34) to create the new, larger Ringsaker Municipality.

Name
The municipality was named after the old Nes farm where the first Nes Church was located. The name is identical with the word  which means "headland".

Government
All municipalities in Norway, including Nes, are responsible for primary education (through 10th grade), outpatient health services, senior citizen services, unemployment and other social services, zoning, economic development, and municipal roads. The municipality was governed by a municipal council of elected representatives, which in turn elected a mayor.

Municipal council
The municipal council  of Nes was made up of 23 representatives that were elected to four year terms.  The party breakdown of the final municipal council was as follows:

See also
List of former municipalities of Norway

References

Ringsaker
Former municipalities of Norway
1838 establishments in Norway
1964 disestablishments in Norway
Landforms of Innlandet
Peninsulas of Norway